The Movies is a business simulation game created by Lionhead Studios for Microsoft Windows and ported to Mac OS X by Feral Interactive. Players run a Hollywood film studio, creating films that can be exported from the game. The Movies was released in November 2005 to positive reviews and several awards, but sold poorly. An expansion, The Movies: Stunts & Effects, was released in 2006.

Gameplay
The Movies allows players to run their own movie studio, including designing the studio itself and managing the careers of film stars. The game starts at the birth of cinema and continues into the future.

Players can create their own movies using in-game assets and at one time could upload them to the game's website The Movies Online.

Development
Lionhead Studios co-founder Peter Molyneux came up with the original idea and development began in February 2002. An early version of the game was ready to show to journalists at the European Computer Trade Show in September 2002.

The game was released in November 2005 and by the end of the year had sold above 50,000 copies in the United Kingdom, a number that Eurogamer's Kristan Reed called "relatively minor". The game ultimately received a "Silver" sales award from the Entertainment and Leisure Software Publishers Association (ELSPA), indicating sales of at least 100,000 copies in the region.

The soundtrack for the game was composed by Daniel Pemberton.

Stunts and Effects expansion pack

In June 2006, Lionhead studios released the expansion pack The Movies: Stunts and Effects. Feral Interactive ported the expansion to Mac OS in 2008. The expansion added stunts and stuntmen, new special effects, fewer camera placement restrictions, and expanded environments and clothing options.

Reception

Review aggregator Metacritic gave the PC version a score of 84 out of 100 ("Generally favorable reviews") based on 62 reviews from critics. The first review was published by GameSpy, which gave the game a 3.5 out of 5. Metacritic gave the expansion, The Movies: Stunts & Effects, a score of 78 out of 100 based on 37 reviews from critics.

Computer Games Magazine gave The Movies their 2005 "Best Utility" and "Best Original Music" awards. The game won the best simulation award at the 2006 BAFTA Video Games Awards

Looking back at the game in 2015, Rock, Paper, Shotgun said that it had promising features but failed to deliver on them. In 2016, The Guardian called The Moviess online service "[p]erhaps the most forward-thinking feature" because it pre-dated YouTube by a year.

Use in machinima

Using The Movies, Alex Chan, a French resident with no previous filmmaking experience, took four days to create The French Democracy, a short machinima political film about the 2005 civil unrest in France.

References

External links

2005 video games
Activision games
Animation software
Business simulation games
Feral Interactive games
Filmmaking video games
Interactive Achievement Award winners
MacOS games
Lionhead Studios games
Video games scored by Daniel Pemberton
Video games set in the 20th century
Video games set in the 2000s
Video games with expansion packs
Windows games
RenderWare games
BAFTA winners (video games)
D.I.C.E. Award for Strategy/Simulation Game of the Year winners
Video games developed in the United Kingdom
Multiplayer and single-player video games